Willis Van Devanter (born December 27, 1930) is one of the world's top manuscript appraisers.  He has appraised and helped place the papers of many notable Americans, ranging from W. Averell Harriman to Irving Berlin and the Reverend Martin Luther King Jr.

Life
Born in Washington D.C., he attended St Albans, Hotchkiss, and Yale University, where he majored in American Studies, Class of 1952.  He then entered Harvard Law School at the urging of his father, who hoped he would reestablish the link to the lawyers in their family. His grandfather and namesake, Willis Van Devanter, had served 26 years as a U.S. Supreme Court Justice, from 1911 to 1937.

Van Devanter knew that it would displease his father when he told him he wanted to drop out of Harvard Law to pursue his real love.  Over breakfast one morning he reluctantly broke the news.

“I’m dropping out of law school,” he said.  “I want to go to Columbia and get a master’s degree in library science.“

As Van Devanter recalled years later, his banker father looked at him with stunned disbelief and said, “You want to be a librarian?  That’s one of the three jobs open to women—nurses, secretaries, librarians.  A librarian is nothing but a file clerk!”

Deeply wounded by his father's response, he sought a meeting with the Librarian of Congress to get his advice. After he recounted what his father had told him, the Librarian laughed and said, “In essence, your father is right.  We are all file clerks.  But what a file it is!  It contains the world’s body of knowledge.” Encouraged by the Librarian, he entered Columbia University the following fall.

While at Columbia he began to attend the auctions held by Parker-Bernet (now Sotheby's) and Christie's in New York.

“I would go to the previews that the auction houses held before a sale and buy their catalogs,” Van Devanter said.  “I brought the catalogs back to my apartment and studied the material intensely. Then I assigned a price to the works on sale as though I was the art appraiser for the auction.  As time went on, the price I assigned to the art work often came closer to the final sale price than the price set by Sotheby’s or Christie’s.”

After receiving a master's degree from Columbia University, he served as a public information officer with the U.S. Military Command in Wiesbaden, Germany.  Upon his discharge from the army, he became the acting curator of graphic arts at Princeton University.

After Van Devanter worked a year at Princeton, his former mentor at Yale University, head librarian Jim Babb, recommended him for a job as the personal curator for Paul Mellon.

Mellon's father, Andrew W. Mellon, a multimillionaire Pittsburgh businessman and a former U.S. Treasury Secretary, had established and—in effect—had donated the National Gallery of Art in Washington to the people of the United States.

His son Paul carried on his father's work as a philanthropist. At age 27, Van Devanter became Mellon's chief of staff for art and rare books.  He did everything from working with art dealers to buying books and entertaining Mellon's guests.

“Everything I know is based on Paul Mellon and the great experiences I had traveling around the world and finding treasures,” he said.

Together they virtually cornered the market on the works of William Blake, the English poet, painter, and printmaker.  Facsimiles were created from Blake's work and many of them wound up in American universities.

When Van Devanter learned that Sotheby's might sell some of the works of John Locke, he flew to England, rented a bike, and chased down the Oxford librarian on his morning bicycle ride to work, to seek his cooperation.

He also worked with Paul Mellon to buy and place the Vinland Map at Yale. The still controversial map, which was found in Spain, purportedly showed that the Norse had discovered America before Columbus.

By the end of his 17-years as a Mellon associate, Van Devanter had helped assemble and catalog one of the greatest collections of Americana in the United States.  The collection was, on Mellon's instructions, divided among two Virginia institutions and Yale upon his death.

After leaving Paul Mellon, Van Devanter worked two years for a leading Washington D.C. art and antiques dealer, appraising paintings and books—and then struck out on his own. His reputation soon spread and he began to consult with museums and universities across America, including major institutions such as the Smithsonian and the Library of Congress.

He proved to have a natural touch with the rich and poor, the celebrated or the unknown.  Far from being an art snob, he treated everyone with equal respect, no matter the value of the treasures they brought for his appraisal.

A Washington Post article in 2003 caught his business manner perfectly.

“Book and art appraiser Willis Van Devanter,” the Post wrote, “seemed to appreciate the family treasures laid before him in a meeting room of the Thomas Balch Library in Leesburg, some wrapped in bath towels and others covered by black trash bags. His voice was soft, and he found something nice to say about the worn items.  But when it came to appraising their value, he was all business.”

Van Devanter shifted gears easily when he was asked to appraise more weighty subjects, such as the hand-drawn sketches by the celebrated architect, Philip Johnson.

According to the New York Times on August 8, 2010, Van Devanter described the Johnson archive as “absolutely essential to the study of modern architecture,” and called Johnson “the major influence in world architecture of the latter 20th Century.” 
  
As he entered his eighties, and was still riding a bicycle as his favorite mode of transportation, Willis Van Devanter was considered by many experts to be the preeminent document appraiser in America.  He was called upon to appraise the papers of such diverse personages as the novelist Philip Roth and the Senator Robert Byrd.

When asked by young people how to become an art appraiser, his answer was always the same.

“Starve for ten years.  Learn more than you ever thought you would have to know.  And be damned lucky!”

References 

1. All quotes by Willis Van Devanter in this article are from his memoir in progress entitled ART EXPERT: Appraising My Life by Willis Van Devanter.
2. See the autobiography of Paul Mellon Reflections in a Silver Spoon by Paul Mellon with John Baskett.

3. For a comprehensive account of Andrew W. Mellon and his family, see David Cannadine, MELLON: An American Life, Knopf, 2006, .

External links 
 WillisVanDevanter.com
 Washingtonian Appraisals of DC (van Devanter)

Living people
1930 births